MXiPr (Methoxisopropamine, Isopropyloxetamine, Isopropyxetamine') is a recreational designer drug with dissociative effects. It is an arylcyclohexylamine derivative, related to drugs such as ketamine and methoxetamine. It was first identified in Slovenia in December 2020, and was made illegal in Hungary in April 2021.

See also 
 3-Methyl-PCP
 Deoxymethoxetamine
 Fluorexetamine
 MDPCP
 Methoxpropamine
 O-PCE

References 

Arylcyclohexylamines
Designer drugs
Dissociative drugs
O-methylated phenols
Isopropylamino compounds